The University Town (Gao jiao yuan qu) lies at the foot of the Daluo hills (大罗山) in Chashan town, 20 km south east of Wenzhou City.

With the conceptual planning and preparation initiated in August 2000, the current university town spans an area of 8 square kilometres, and has grown to accommodate a total student population of 55,725; the majority of these are undergraduate students, with the rest consisting of 3,073 Graduate students and 519 International students.

It serves as the home of the main campuses for three teaching institutions (and their respective constituent schools): 
Wenzhou Medical College
Wenzhou University
Wenzhou Technical College

Entertainment
Business Center lies in the University Town, Gao jiao yuan qu. In Business Center, there are many snacks and restaurants like Lan Tian Snack Restaurant and Dream Tasty Restaurant.
Bars, supermarket, cinema and other entertainment along with Industrial and Commercial Bank of China make up of a busy town.

It is a rapidly developing sub-urban area bordered by farms, some of which specialize in growing two of Wenzhou's specialties: Chinese Bayberry (杨梅, Yangmei) and the Wenzhou Oranges (温州蜜柑, Wēnzhōu Mìgān & 欧柑, ōugān - Citrus suavissima Hort. ex Tanaka).

References 

Education in Wenzhou